Loy is a genus of sea slugs, dorid nudibranchs, marine gastropod mollusks in the family Corambidae within the superfamily Onchidoridoidea.

Species 
Species within the genus Loy include:

 Loy meyeni  Martynov, 1994  
 Loy millenae  Martynov, 1994 
 Loy thompsoni  (Millen & Nybakken, 1991)

References

External links 
 https://web.archive.org/web/20091228180914/http://www.seaslugforum.net/specieslist.cfm

Corambidae